Boryslav is a city located on the Tysmenytsia (a tributary of the Dniester), in Drohobych Raion, Lviv Oblast (region) of western Ukraine. It hosts the administration of Boryslav urban hromada, one of the hromadas of Ukraine. Boryslav is a major center of petroleum industry. Population:

History

The area of the modern town of Boryslav has been inhabited at least since the Bronze Age. There are remnants of a pagan shrine from the 1st millennium BC located in the area, where approximately 270 petroglyphs are found, mostly depicting solar signs – symbols of a pre-Christian Solar deity. Between the 9th and 13th centuries, the site of the modern town housed a fortress named Tustan, which was part of a belt of similar strongholds defending the Kievan Rus' from the west and south. After the dissolution of Kievan Rus', the town became a part of the Halych-Volhynian Principality. With the collapse of the latter, in the 14th century Boryslav became a part of the Crown of the Kingdom of Poland. It was first mentioned in a document from 19 March 1387, listing all personal belongings of Queen regnant Jadwiga of Poland.

Since that time, Borysław, as it was then called, was a small town related to the nearby metropolis of Lwów (currently Lviv, Ukraine) and mostly shared its fate. In 1772, during the Partitions of Poland, it was annexed by Austria and became a part of the Austrian Kingdom of Galicia and Lodomeria. One of the great technological developments of the 19th century was the discovery by pharmacists Johan (Jan) Zeh (:uk:Зег Ян, :pl:Jan Zeh) (1817–1897)) and Ignacy Łukasiewicz, in nearby Lviv, of technology that led to the establishment of a new industry based on petroleum. Scientists worked out a method of distilling Boryslaw crude oil, and on 30 March 1853 made the first kerosene lamp. As early as 31 July 1853 their new lamp was used to illuminate the Public Hospital in Lviv. Their discoveries marked the beginnings of the rapid search for petroleum in the Carpathians — especially in the eastern sector of the mountain chain where rich oil deposits were discovered. In 1854 the first ozokerite mine was started in the town after the ore was discovered by Robert Doms. In the second half of 1853, following the research of Jan Zeh, Ignacy Łukasiewicz and several other scientists working in the nearby city of Lemberg  (the then official name of Lviv), the town and its surroundings saw the emergence of an oil industry. One of the first oil rigs in the world was built near Boryslav by Robert Doms in 1861. The number of oil rigs also rose from 4,000 in 1870 to over 12,000 three years later. The oil boom drew many industry moguls from all over Austria-Hungary and many fortunes were earned and lost there. A period of prosperity saw the city's population grew as almost 10,000 new workers arrived to the area. In 1886 an oil mining school was opened in Borysław, one of the first such facilities in Europe. Also the ozokerite, a natural mineral wax, mined in Borysław, was used for insulation of the first trans-Atlantic telegraphic cable line. On 31 December 1872, a railway line linking Borysław with the nearby city of Drohobycz (now Drohobych, Ukraine) was opened. In 1909, more than 1,920,000 tonnes of oil were produced in the region — roughly 5% of the world's oil production at that time making the region the third biggest producer of oil after the US and the Russian Empire in the world.

After the Great War the area became part of the new West Ukrainian People's Republic. After the Polish-Ukrainian War of November 1918 – July 1919 the area became part of the newly reborn Poland. In 1920 the mining school was significantly expanded and was renamed to Carpathian Geological Station, a de facto oil mining university. As the capital of the Zagłębie Borysławskie (Borysław Oil Basin), the town of Borysław was the centre of then Polish oil and ozokerite extraction industries and one of the most important industrial zones of Poland. Because of that, on 26 July 1933 the town was granted a city charter. Together with the nearby settlement of Tustanowice (Tustanovychi, now part of Boryslav), Boryslaw produced in 1925 about 80% of Polish oil (812,000 tons). Boryslav was then commonly called the "Polish Baku". In the period 1929–1936, oil extraction shrank from 511,000 to 319,000 tonnes of oil annually.

After the 1939 Soviet invasion of Poland, the town was annexed by the Soviet Union under the terms of the Molotov–Ribbentrop Pact. It was allocated to the Ukrainian SSR and renamed Boryslav. In 1941, the city fell under German control upon the advances of the German army to the east at the start of Soviet–German hostilities.

On the day following the Germans' arrival, local Ukrainians launched a pogrom, participated in by some German soldiers, that murdered approximately 350 Jews  and wounded and robbed many more. The  first official anti-Jewish actions began at the end of November 1941, when around 1,500 Jews, the majority of whom were deemed weak and unable to work, were shot by the Ukrainian militia and  German security police in the forest near the town of Truskavets. During the winter of 1941–1942, many Jews died of hunger and disease, including typhus. In May 1942, an official ghetto was established; some Jews from neighboring towns were brought there to live.  At the beginning of August 1942, Jews, including those from neighboring villages, like Pidbuzh and Skhidnytsya, were rounded up by the German police, Ukrainian Auxiliary Police, and Jewish police.  Some were shot on the spot, about 400 were sent to the Janowska labor camp near Lwow, and 5000 were sent to Belzec where they were immediately gassed.  During this action, the manager of the German Karpathen oil company, Berthold Beitz, rescued about 250 children.  

Following this, two separate ghettos were created in Boryslav, including one for workers in the oil industry. In October 1942, the German and local Ukrainians and Poles, led by German soldiers, rounded up more than 1000 Jews and sent them to Belzec to be murdered. In another action in November, about 1500 Jews were rounded up, held for three weeks under depraved conditions in a local cinema, and then sent to Belzec.  Beitz again was able to rescue some children and help some adults escape across the Hungarian border. During the fifth action in February 1943, 600 Jews were shot by members of the Ukrainian Auxiliary Police, German police, and the Schupo. The isolated executions of Jews in hiding took place all the time from May till June 1943 until the total liquidation of the Boryslav ghetto at the end of June 1943. Over the course of one week, the German forces murdered around 700 Jews (sick, young and elderly Jews and members of the Jewish Police). Other Jews were hunted down by Ukrainian and German forces and shot. The remaining Jews were deported to different labor camps (Plaszów and Mauthausen) from April to June 1944. In all, over 10,000 Jews native to Boryslaw were shot by Germans and Ukrainians or murdered in the camps.  

Some Jews escaped and formed partisan units in the forests.  Resistance groups in the ghetto obtained some arms and set fire to some raw materials in ghetto industry.  After the war, Berthold Beitz and several Polish and Ukrainian families held save Jews and were recognized  as Righteous among the Nations by Yad Vashem.  About 400 Boryslav Jews survived, of the 13,000 Jewish residents at the beginning of the war. For a description of the activities in Boryslav during the war, see the Encyclopedia of Camps and Ghettos.

A personal-account history of this period is recounted by the Polish-American writer — and Boryslav native — Wilhelm Dichter in his popular and acclaimed literary debut, Koń Pana Boga. It is a memoir of the war in Borsylav as Dichter experienced it as a Polish-Jewish child.

Following Germany's defeat in World War II, the town came again under Soviet rule. Since 1991 the town has been part of an independent Ukraine. The oil industry remains operating. Experts believe that potential oil fields around Boryslav contain far more stocks.

Until 18 July 2020, Boryslav was designated as a city of oblast significance and belonged to Boryslav Municipality. As part of the administrative reform of Ukraine, which reduced the number of raions of Lviv Oblast to seven, Boryslav Municipality was merged into Drohobych Raion.

Landmarks and visitor attractions
 Tustan fortress, a historic-cultural preserve
 Skole Beskids, a National Park

International relations

Twin town – sister city
Boryslav is twinned with:
  Wałbrzych  in Poland (since 27 February 2009)

People from Boryslav

 Hank Brodt (1925-2020), Holocaust survivor and author of Hank Brodt Holocaust Memoirs. A Candle and a Promise [Amsterdam Publishers, 2016].
 Johan (Jan) Zeh (1817–1897), pharmacist, discovery of technology that led to the establishment of a new industry based on petroleum. Scientists worked out a method of distilling Boryslaw crude oil, and on 30 March 1853 constructed the first kerosine lamp.
 Mykhailo Dragan (1899–1952), Ukrainian art historian, born in Tustanovychi.
José Maurer (1906-1968), stage and cinema actor starring mainly in the Yiddish theatre in Europe, Argentina and Israel
Zbigniew Balik (born 1935), Polish scientist and politician, deputy to the Sejm 1989–1991.
 Wilhelm Dichter (born 1935), engineer, Holocaust survivor and writer.
 Wladyslaw Nehrebecki (1923–1978), a Polish animator and cartoon director, creator of Bolek and Lolek.
 Michael Sobell (1892–1993), British businessman and philanthropist.
 Szewach Weiss (born 1935), Israeli politician.
 Vira Vovk (born 1926), Ukrainian poet.
 Zdzisław Żygulski, Jr. (1921–2015), Polish art historian and professor of the Academy of Fine Arts in Kraków.

Gallery

See also
 Wilhelm Dichter
 Sabina Wolanski (1927–2011), Holocaust survivor

References

External links

 Boryslav in the Encyclopedia of Ukraine
 Soviet military topographic map 1:100,000
 holocaust memories [memories of a lost childhood by holocaust from Prof. Lipman]
  [Hank Brodt Holocaust Memoirs - A Candle and a Promise by Deborah Donnelly]

Cities in Lviv Oblast
Cities of regional significance in Ukraine
Shtetls
Holocaust locations in Ukraine